Wellington Aparecido Martins (born 28 January 1991), simply known as Wellington, is a Brazilian professional footballer who plays as a defensive midfielder.

Club career

Honours
São Paulo
Campeonato Brasileiro Série A: 2008
Copa Sudamericana: 2012

Athletico Paranaense
Copa Sudamericana: 2018
J.League Cup / Copa Sudamericana Championship: 2019
Copa do Brasil: 2019

References

External links

1991 births
Living people
Footballers from São Paulo
Brazilian footballers
Association football midfielders
Campeonato Brasileiro Série A players
São Paulo FC players
Sport Club Internacional players
CR Vasco da Gama players
Club Athletico Paranaense players
Fluminense FC players